Roger Peterson may refer to:

Roger Tory Peterson (1908–1996), ornithologist
Roger Peterson (musician) (born 1980), Aruban-Dutch musician
Roger Peterson (pilot) (1937–1959), pilot of the plane that crashed killing Buddy Holly, Ritchie Valens and Jiles Perry Richardson (The Big Bopper)

See also
 Roger Peters (born 1944), English footballer
 Roger Pettersson (born 1973), Swedish boxer
 Roger Pettersson (tennis) (1972), Swedish tennis player